Deborah "Debbie" Lee (born 1974) is a former Australian rules football player and coach.

She has campaigned for recognition of women's Australian rules football in Australia, giving up a WNBL career to focus on developing the sport.

She was later appointed president of the Victorian Women's Football League (VWFL).

Apart from being the president of the VWFL, she played for the St Albans Spurs. She first played in 1990 with the East Brunswick Scorpions before forming her own club in 1992, the Spurs. Hall won the Helen Lambert Medal as the Victorian women's competition best and fairest five times and was an All-Australian named player six times.

She was at the same time appointed as the club's VFLW coach for the 2018 season. A key initiative of Lee's were the Melbourne-Western Bulldogs exhibition matches that ultimately paved the way for the formation of the AFLW.

Lee was the first-ever female inductee to the Australian Football Hall of Fame in 2021 for her playing excellence and for being the driving force for women's AFL.

References

Victorian Women's Football League players
1974 births
Living people
Australian rules footballers from Victoria (Australia)